The Garden of the Finzi-Continis is a 1970 historical drama film directed by Vittorio De Sica. The screenplay by Ugo Pirro and Vittorio Bonicelli adapts Italian Jewish author Giorgio Bassani's 1962 semi-autobiographical novel of the same name, about the lives of an upper-class Jewish family in Ferrara during the Fascist era. The film stars Lino Capolicchio, Dominique Sanda, Helmut Berger, Romolo Valli, and Fabio Testi in his breakthrough role.

An Italian production with West German financing, The Garden of the Finzi-Continis was entered into the 21st Berlin International Film Festival and won the Golden Bear. It received positive acclaim from international critics, winning the 1972 Academy Award for Best Foreign Language Film and earning a nomination for Best Adapted Screenplay. The film holds a 100% review score on Rotten Tomatoes.

Plot
In 1938 in Ferrara, the Finzi Contini are a rich Jewish family living in a mansion set in a park. When Jews are banned from the city's tennis club, the family allow the friends of their two children, Micòl and the sickly Alberto, to use their private tennis court. Among them are Giorgio, son of a Jewish businessman, and Giampiero, a communist and a gentile. Giorgio has been in love with Micòl since early adolescence, but she is ambivalent.

As war approaches, Giorgio's brother moves to France to pursue his studies while Giorgio, close to graduation, decides to stay in Ferrara and, when Jews are banned from the university library, the Finzi Contini allow him to use their private library. Micòl leaves to stay in Venice and on her return to Ferrara she definitively rejects Giorgio.

In 1940, when Italy enters the war, Giampiero is conscripted while Giorgio as a Jew is exempt. On his last night  in Ferrara, Giampiero meets up with Giorgio and, when they part at midnight. Giorgio has an urge to see Micòl one more time. Climbing the wall of the Finzi Contini park, he notices a light in the garden hut and, looking in, sees a naked Micòl beside Giampiero.

In 1943, amid rumours of further measures against the Jews, Giorgio goes underground and the police arrest the whole Finzi Contini family, holding them with the other Jews of the city in a school. Micòl finds herself herded with her frail grandmother into the same classroom she attended as a child. There she sees Giorgio's father, who informs her that Giorgio has escaped and that Giampiero has died in Russia. The two embrace, their future as unclear as the fog hanging over the city.

Cast

Casting notes 
The Garden of the Finzi-Continis marked the debut or near-debut for some of its stars, notably the actors who played the two adult Finzi-Contini children, Micòl and Alberto. For Dominique Sanda (Micòl), it was her first Italian feature film (followed by such films as The Conformist and 1900). For Helmut Berger (Alberto), it was his third feature film.

Production 
The director seriously considered entrusting the lead role to singer Patty Pravo, who had to refuse due to too many work commitments.

Screenplay 
Contrary to Bassani's novel, the film directed by De Sica does not use the narrating ego technique, which for the novel is compared by the critics to the author himself. However, while following the director an entirely dialogative film narrative, the novelist's narrator coincides with the role of the protagonist Giorgio. Contrary to Bassani's novel, the film directed by De Sica ends with the episode of the deportation. In the novel, Giorgio, who fled abroad in time, will tell the story of his youth and his first impossible love, recalling the facts after 14 years.

De Sica and Bassani 
Initially Giorgio Bassani cooperated in the drafting of the dialogues and the screenplay of the film but after some disagreements and misunderstandings, the writer and the director entered into open conflict (also due to the fact that in the film the relationship between Micòl and Malnate is made explicit, which is not present in the novel). Bassani asked that his name be removed from the credits of the film. His name was duly removed as one of its script-writers and the opening credits just state that it was ‘freely derived from the novel by Giorgio Bassani'.

Locations 
Villa Ada near Rome was used for the garden, while the Finzi Contini villa is the Litta Bolognini villa in Vedano al Lambro, a municipality in the Brianza area, adjacent to the Monza Park.
The other exteriors were shot in Ferrara; noteworthy are the Estense castle and the city walls, the Palazzo dei Diamanti, the Cathedral of San Giorgio and also some famous streets.

Reception 
In 1972, The Garden of the Finzi-Continis won the Academy Award for Best Foreign Language Film and was nominated for Best Screenplay Based on Material from Another Medium. It won the Golden Bear at the 21st Berlin International Film Festival in 1971. It was De Sica's penultimate film.

Restoration 
The restored digital version, curated by the Istituto Luce Cinecittà and performed at the "Studio Cine" in Rome and "The rediscovered image" in Bologna, was presented in the spring of 2015.

See also 
 List of Holocaust films
 List of submissions to the 44th Academy Awards for Best Foreign Language Film
 List of Italian submissions for the Academy Award for Best Foreign Language Film

References

Further reading
 Tibbetts, John C., and James M. Welsh, eds. The Encyclopedia of Novels Into Film (2nd ed. 2005) pp 148–149.

External links 

 
 

1970 films
1970 drama films
1970s war drama films
Best Foreign Language Film Academy Award winners
Films about Jews and Judaism
Films about the upper class
Films based on Italian novels
Films directed by Vittorio De Sica
Films scored by Manuel De Sica
Films with screenplays by Ugo Pirro
Films set in Ferrara
Films set in Emilia-Romagna
Films set in the 1930s
Films set in the 1940s
German historical drama films
German war drama films
German World War II films
Golden Bear winners
Holocaust films
1970s Italian-language films
Italian war drama films
Italian World War II films
Italian historical drama films
West German films
1970s Italian films
1970s German films
Films about Fascist Italy
Films shot in Lazio
Films set in 1938
Films set in 1940
Films set in 1943